Ram Singh Netaji  (born 1956) is an Indian politician and was member of the 2nd and the Fourth Legislative Assemblies of Delhi. Currently, he is a member of the Aam Aadmi Party.

Early life and education
Ram Singh Netaji was born in Badarpur village of New Delhi. He is educated till 7th grade and is an agriculturist by profession. He is from Gurjar 
Community.

Political career
Ram Singh Netaji was MLA for two terms from Badarpur (Assembly constituency). During the Second Legislative Assembly of Delhi he contested as an Independent candidate whereas during the Fourth Legislative Assembly of Delhi he was member of Bahujan Samaj Party. He is currently a member of the Aam Aadmi Party. He joined Aam Aadmi Party in presence of National Convener and current Chief Minister of Delhi Arvind Kejriwal and other Senior Party Leaders Manish Sisodia and Sanjay Singh (Aam Aadmi Party) on 13 January 2020.

Posts held

See also

Second Legislative Assembly of Delhi
Fourth Legislative Assembly of Delhi
Delhi Legislative Assembly
Government of India
Politics of India
Bahujan Samaj Party
Indian National Congress
Aam Aadmi Party

References 

Delhi politicians
Living people
1956 births
People from New Delhi
Bahujan Samaj Party politicians
Indian National Congress politicians
Aam Aadmi Party politicians
Aam Aadmi Party candidates in the 2020 Delhi Legislative Assembly election
Delhi MLAs 2008–2013
Delhi MLAs 1998–2003